Jamaica competed at the 1988 Summer Paralympics in Seoul, South Korea. 5 competitors from Jamaica won 8 medals including 1 gold, 4 silver and 3 bronze and finished 33rd in the medal table.

See also 
 Jamaica at the Paralympics
 Jamaica at the 1988 Summer Olympics

References 

Nations at the 1988 Summer Paralympics
1988
Summer Paralympics